Alport Height is a hill near Wirksworth in Derbyshire. It is a popular picnic site, since it has extensive views to the South, and is the first hill over  within easy reach of the Derby area. Like Shining Cliff Woods, 2 km to the east, it is in the care of the National Trust. It was one of their first acquisitions in Derbyshire, acquired in 1930.

It is possible to see Derby city centre from the summit, as well as The Wrekin, the Long Mynd, and the Clee Hill. It is also possible to see the Sutton Coldfield and Lichfield masts, and the Birmingham city centre skyline, and also the Lickey Hills just beyond Birmingham. The Pye Green BT Tower on Cannock Chase can also be seen.

There are eight radio masts and associated buildings in a compound on the summit (not on Trust land).

The boulder has 3 or 4 recognised climbing routes up it, one being an 8 m route of climbing-grade E5. John Gill's bouldering website has early photographs of pioneer climbers in action on the Stone.

See also
 Alport Castles in the High Peak area
 Alport, a hamlet in the White Peak area

References

Mountains and hills of the Peak District
Mountains and hills of Derbyshire